James Erwin (November 27, 1920 – July 14, 2005) was an American politician and attorney from Maine. He served as Maine Attorney General from 1967 to 1971 and was twice a candidate for Governor of Maine as a Republican – he was the nominee in the 1970 and 1974 elections.

References

1920 births
2005 deaths
Republican Party members of the Maine House of Representatives
Republican Party Maine state senators
Politicians from New York City
People from Englewood, New Jersey
People from York, Maine
Dartmouth College alumni
20th-century American politicians
Lawyers from New York City
20th-century American lawyers